Anne Gellinek (born 1962) is a German journalist and TV host who has been one of the anchors of heute-journal, a television news magazine broadcast on German public-service broadcaster ZDF, since 2022.

Gellinek previously worked as the Brussels Bureau Chief of ZDF and was ranked as number 6 among influential women in Brussels by European affairs weekly newspaper Politico in 2018.

Early life and education 
Gellinek was born in 1962 in Mülheim an der Ruhr, Germany.

Starting university in 1981, Gellinek studied Slavic Studies, Eastern European History and Journalism in Münster and Moscow.

Career 
While in Moscow, Gellinek worked as a freelance journalist for the Moscow offices of the Rheinische Post and Newsweek. From 1991 to 1992 she interned at ZDF in Mainz and from 1992 to 1995 she worked for ZDF in Düsseldorf. In 1994 Gellinek also received a  three-month grant from the Arthur F. Burns Fellowships for Young Journalists in Seattle, US. Since the, Gellinek has continued to work for German broadcaster ZDF, as a journalist and TV-host, in Berlin and Moscow.

In August 2014, Gellinek started as a correspondent at the ZDF studio Brussels and in 2015 she was promoted to Brussels bureau chief of ZDF. In 2018 Politico, named Gellinek as one of the most influential women shaping Brussels politics.

References 

German television journalists
20th-century German journalists
21st-century German journalists
1962 births
Living people
German women television journalists
ZDF people